Ulutup (Olotöp) is a rural locality (a khutor) in Yumaguzinsky Selsoviet, Kugarchinsky District, Bashkortostan, Russia. The population was 26 as of 2010. There are 2 streets.

Geography 
Ulutup is located 34 km northwest of Mrakovo (the district's administrative centre) by road. Yumaguzino is the nearest rural locality.

References 

Rural localities in Kugarchinsky District